Manawatū or Manawatu may refer to:

Places 
 Manawatū District, New Zealand
 Manawatū Plains, New Zealand
 Manawatū River, New Zealand
 Manawatū Gorge, New Zealand

Other 
 Manawatū Standard, a daily paper
 Manawatu Rugby Union, a sports body

See also
 Manawatū-Whanganui, region of New Zealand